The Bärglistock (also spelled Berglistock) (3,656 m) is a mountain of the Bernese Alps, located east of Grindelwald in the Bernese Oberland. The mountain is the tripoint between the valleys of the Upper Grindelwald Glacier, the Unteraar Glacier and the Gauli Glacier.

References

External links
Bärglistock on Hikr

Mountains of the Alps
Alpine three-thousanders
Bernese Alps
Mountains of Switzerland
Mountains of the canton of Bern